Talara megaspila is a moth in the subfamily Arctiinae. It is found in Tefé, Brazil.

References

Arctiidae genus list at Butterflies and Moths of the World of the Natural History Museum

Lithosiini